Grøn is a surname. Notable people with the surname include:

Edith Grøn  (1917–1990), Danish-born Nicaraguan sculptor
Kristian Fredrik Grøn (1855–1931), Norwegian dermatologist
Øyvind Grøn (born 1944), Norwegian physicist

Danish-language surnames
Norwegian-language surnames